Ben Lomond High School is a comprehensive high school located in the Ogden City School District of Ogden, Utah, United States, currently educating students in grades 10–12.  As of 2018, the principal is Steve Poll, his first year at Ben Lomond (2018/19).

History
Ben Lomond High School was named for the nearby Ben Lomond Mountain, so called by Scottish settlers who were reminded of Ben Lomond in Scotland. This local cultural influence gave the school its theme, including bagpipers, Royal Stewart tartan, and Scots. Students are known as "Friendly Fighting Scots."

The school was originally to be called North East Ogden High School, with school colors of black and red and the spikes (a reference to the golden spike driven into the Transcontinental railroad) as the mascot; however, at the very first assembly held on the floor of the wood shop (the school was yet to be finished) the students said that since the school was closest to Ben Lomond it should be named hence. "We weren’t going to Ogden High and we didn't want to be called Ogden High," one student recalled fifty years later. After renaming the school, the "Scot" became the mascot and the school's colors were changed to red, white and blue, the colors of traditional Scottish uniforms (Stewart tartan).

Rivalry

Ben Lomond has a long running rivalry with Ogden High School which culminates each year with a football game known as the "Iron Horse" game. The winner takes possession of a trophy called the Iron Horse, a statue of two trains to signify Ogden's well-known railroad history. In the most recent game, on October 12, 2022, Ben Lomond lost to Ogden High School 21-14.

The rivalry also exists in basketball, although not as strongly.

Renovations
In June 2006, residents of Ogden passed a bond to obtain money to reconstruct and renovate Ben Lomond High and other Ogden City schools. A partial demolition commenced in June 2007 on Ben Lomond's library media center, English/Freshmen building, ceramics room, courtyard, boiler/furnace room, the ROTC drill field and two JROTC classrooms, and was completed in September 2007. Construction of a new building was completed in August 2010. This included the construction of new classrooms, cafeteria, commons area, Media Center, office area, and a "facelift" to areas not replaced by new construction, including the auditorium and gym areas. The entry of the school was changed to face 9th Street in a southeasterly direction, with a new address of 1080 9th Street. The renovation of Ben Lomond High School was awarded the Mountain States Construction Silver Award for grades K-12 in 2010.

Hymn
The School Hymn, written by Richard Packham, is sung to the tune of The Bonnie Banks O' Loch Lomond. The song is sung with crossed arms and swaying from side to side. The lyrics are:

From the green Scottish hills where the proud pipers play,
To the Great Salt Lake and the Wasatch,
There's no better clan, nor will there ever be
Than the Friendly Fighting Scots of Ben Lomond.

We're proud of Ben Lomond and all that she stands for,
And though o'er the earth we may wander,
A part of our hearts will always yearn to be
In the memory-hallowed halls of Ben Lomond.

Notable alumni
 Michael Richard "Rich" Clifford (Lieutenant Colonel), Class of 1970 – NASA astronaut
William deVries – cardiothoracic surgeon
Nick Howell – defensive coordinator, Virginia Cavaliers football
Glenn Hubbard – former Atlanta Braves second baseman and current Braves first base coach
 Major General Robertus "Dutch" Remkes (retired) – former Director of Strategy, Policy, and Assessments U.S. European Command, Stuttgart-Vaihingen, Germany
 Richard H. Stallings, Class of 1958 – U.S. Congressman representing Idaho's 2nd congressional district (1985-1993) and Chairman of the Idaho Democratic Party (2005-2007)
 Bill Allred - Local radio host

References

External links
 Ben Lomond High School
 Ogden City School District

Public high schools in Utah
Buildings and structures in Ogden, Utah
Educational institutions established in 1953
Schools in Weber County, Utah
1953 establishments in Utah